Stockholm University College of Music Education (SMI) is a Swedish university college in Stockholm which offers higher education in the field of  music pedagogy in communal arts and culture schools as well as voice and speech pedagogy (logonomy).

SMI is situated at Campus Flemingsberg in Huddinge municipality, together with Södertörn University, Karolinska Institute Huddinge, Red Cross University College of Nursing and the Royal Institute of Technology.

External links 
 Official website for Stockholms Musikpedagogiska Institut SMI 
 University College of Music Education 

University colleges in Sweden
Higher education in Stockholm